Mighty Mouth is a South Korean duet male group made up of Sangchu and Shorry J. Debuted in 2008 with their Energy album featuring Yoon Eun Hye for "I love you", Sunye of Wonder Girls for "Energy" and Son Dambi for "Family".

On January 18, 2011, Mighty Mouth released Tok Tok as part of their album Mighty Fresh. This was the first of many songs featuring Soya.

On 30 October 2012, Sang-chu enlisted for mandatory military service for five weeks of basic training followed by 21 months as an active-duty soldier with the 306th draft in Uijeongbu, Gyeonggi Province, where he served along with Super Junior's leader Leeteuk until his discharge on 8 Aug 2014.

In April 2016, the duo launched their own agency Allmighty Records.

Members
 Sangchu (상추)
 Shorry J (쇼리 J)

Acting

In 2012, Sangchu had a cameo role as a 'muscle boy' student in the K-drama To the Beautiful You, in a bathroom scene with the lead role played by Sulli who was disguised as a boy.

In 2014, Shorry J had his first acting role in a K-drama, Triangle, as a gang member and friend of the lead role played by Kim Jae-joong. In April 2016, he portrayed a skilled pickpocket in the historical K-drama The Flower in Prison.

Controversies
Sangchu was under investigation for allegedly visiting a massage parlour, famous for prostitution, whilst on military duty on June 22, 2013, alongside Se7en. It was decided that they broke curfew trying to get massages. They allegedly visited several parlors that were closed before they found one that was open late. They left once they realized that it was a parlor for prostitution. Both received ten days in military jail for their actions.

Discography

Studio albums

Extended plays

Singles

Awards 
Seoul Music Awards - Newcomer Award (2009)

Mnet Asian Music Awards

References

External links
101 Entertainment 
YMC Entertainment 

Musical groups established in 2008
South Korean hip hop groups
Male musical duos
Hip hop duos
South Korean male rappers